Walddorfhäslach is a town in the district of Reutlingen in Baden-Württemberg in Germany.

References

Reutlingen (district)